Les Accords de Bella is a 2007 anthropological documentary film directed by David Constantin. It was selected by the African Film Festival of Cordoba - FCAT.

Synopsis 
Rodrigues Island, lost in the middle of the Indian Ocean, has something particular: There are more than 500 accordions for 35,000 people. Polkas, mazurkas and waltzes are part of the history and mestization of an island forgotten by all for a very long time. Here, the accordion is not a forgotten instrument, quite the contrary; its sound mixes with African drums so that young and old can dance. With Philippe Imbert's help, a French craftsman, the Rodrigues Accordion Association has set out on a new adventure: Making their own accordion. The first one, the prototype, completely made on the island, is called Bella.

References

External links 
 festivalfilmafriqueiles.fr

2007 films
Mauritian documentary films
2007 documentary films
Anthropology documentary films
Documentary films about African music